The Academia Guatemalteca de la Lengua (Spanish for Guatemalan Academy of the Language) is an association of academics and experts on the use of the Spanish language in Guatemala. It was founded on June 30, 1887. It is a member of the Association of Spanish Language Academies.

Current members 

 Margarita Carrera Molina
 Gustavo Adolfo Wyld Ferraté
 Mario Alberto Carrera Galindo
 Julia Guillermina Herrera Peña
 Francisco Pérez de Antón
 Rigoberto Juárez-Paz
 Ana M.ª Urruela de Quezada
 Mario Antonio Sandoval Samayoa
 Carmen Matute
 Lucrecia Méndez de Penedo
 Francisco Morales Santos
 Delia Quiñónez Castillo
 Gonzalo de Villa y Vásquez
 Dieter Hasso Lehnhoff Temme
 Mario Roberto Morales Álvarez
 María Raquel Montenegro Muñoz
 José Oswaldo Salazar de León
 Julio Roberto Palomo Silva
 Gustavo Adolfo García Fong
 María del Rosario Molina
 Gloria Hernández
 Luis Aceituno (elect)

References 
 "Academia Guatemalteca de la Lengua." Asociación de Academias de la Lengua Española. Archived from the original on 6 February 2018. Retrieved 6 February 2018.

External links 
 Academia Guatemalteca de la Lengua Española - Official Site
 Academia Guatemalteca de la Lengua - Page on the official site of the Association of Spanish Language Academies

Spanish language academies
Guatemalan culture
Organizations established in 1887
1887 establishments in North America